Kinney High School is a public high school (grades 9–12) located in Rancho Cordova, California.

School History
Kinney High opened in 1966 in an old abandoned school building.  The entire school was replace in 1971 and the original building was demolished.

External links
Kinney High School

References 

High schools in Sacramento, California
Public high schools in California